Aspidoscelis sackii, known commonly as Sack's spotted whiptail, is a species of lizard in the family Teiidae. The species is endemic to Mexico. There are three recognized subspecies.

Etymology
The specific name, sackii, is in honor of German explorer Baron Sebastian Albert von Sack.

Geographic range
A. sackii is found in the Mexican states of Chiapas, Guerrero, Mexico City, Michoacán, Morelos, Oaxaca, Puebla, and Tamaulipas.

Habitat
The preferred natural habitats of A. sackii are forest, shrubland, and desert.

Reproduction
A. sackii is oviparous.

Subspecies
Three subspecies are recognized as being valid, including the nominotypical subspecies.
Aspidoscelis sackii bocourti 
Aspidoscelis sackii gigas 
Aspidoscelis sackii sackii 

Nota bene: A trinomial authority in parentheses indicates that the subspecies was originally described in a genus other than Aspidoscelis.

References

Further reading
Boulenger GA (1885). Catalogue of the Lizards in the British Museum (Natural History). Second Edition. Volume II. ... Teiidæ ... London: Trustees of the British Museum (Natural history). (Taylor and Francis, printers). xiii + 497 pp. + Plates I-XXIV. (Cnemidophorus sexlineatus Var. bocourtii, new variety, pp. 367).
Davis WB, Smith HM (1952). "A New Whiptailed Lizard (Genus Cnemidophorus) from Mexico". Herpetologica 8 (3): 97–100. (Cnemidophorus sackii gigas, new subspecies).
Hernández-Gallegos O, Pérez-Almazán C, López-Moreno AE, Granados-González G (2011). "Aspidoscelis sacki (Sack's Spotted Whiptail). Reproduction". Herpetological Review 42 (3): 428.
Wiegmann AFA (1834). Herpetologia Mexicana, seu descriptio amphibiorum Novae Hispaniae, quae itineribus comitis Sack, Ferdinandi Deppe et Chr. Guil. Schiede in Museum Zoologicum Berolinense pervenerunt. Pars prima, saurorum species amplectens. Adiecto systematis saurorum prodromo, additsque multis in hunc amphibiorum ordinem observationibus. Berlin: C.G. Lüderitz. vi + 54pp. + Plates I-X. (Cnemidophorus sackii, new species, pp. 28–29). (in Latin).

sackii
Reptiles described in 1834
Taxa named by Arend Friedrich August Wiegmann
Reptiles of Mexico